William George Bunter is a fictional schoolboy created by Charles Hamilton using the pen name Frank Richards. He features in stories set at Greyfriars School, a fictional English public school in Kent, originally published in the boys' weekly story paper The Magnet from 1908 to 1940. The character has appeared in novels, on television, in stage plays and in comic strips.

He is in the Lower Fourth form of Greyfriars School, known as the Remove, whose members are 14–15 years of age. Time is frozen in the Greyfriars stories; although the reader sees the passing of the seasons, the characters' ages do not change and they remain in the same year groups. Originally a minor character, Bunter's role was expanded over the years with his antics being heavily used in the stories to provide comic relief and to drive forward the plots.

Bunter's defining characteristics are his greediness and overweight appearance. His character is, in many respects, that of a highly obnoxious anti-hero. As well as his gluttony, he is obtuse, lazy, racist, nosy, deceitful, slothful, self-important and conceited. These defects, however, are not recognised by Bunter. In his own mind, he is an exemplary character: handsome, talented and aristocratic; and he dismisses most of those around him as "beasts". The negative sides of Bunter are offset by several genuine redeeming features; such as his tendency, from time to time, to display courage in aid of others; his ability to be generous, on the rare occasions when he has food or cash; and above all his very real love and concern for his mother. All these, combined with Bunter's cheery optimism, his comically transparent untruthfulness and inept attempts to conceal his antics from his schoolmasters and schoolfellows, combine to make a character that succeeds in being highly entertaining but which rarely attracts the reader's lasting sympathy.

Origins 
Charles Hamilton invented the character for an unpublished story in the late 1890s. He claimed Bunter was derived from three persons: a corpulent editor, a short-sighted relative, and another relative who was perpetually trying to raise a loan.

The identity of the fat editor is unclear: various sources suggest either Lewis Ross Higgins, editor of a number of comic papers and who is described as resembling the author G. K. Chesterton; or Percy Griffith, the original editor of The Magnet. The short-sighted relative was Hamilton's younger sister Una, who had suffered poor sight since childhood, and who had been wont to peer at him somewhat like an Owl; while the other relative was his older brother Alex, who was described as "generally anxious to borrow a pound or two" on the strength of the anticipated arrival of a cheque that never materialised.

Magnet stories
Billy Bunter featured in 1,670 of the 1,683 issues of The Magnet published during the 32-year period from 1908 to 1940.  He was introduced in Magnet No. 1 The Making of Harry Wharton (1908) as a minor character, but developed into one of the principal characters of the stories as author Charles Hamilton realised his comic potential.

George Orwell described him as "...a real creation. His tight trousers against which boots and canes are constantly thudding, his astuteness in search of food, his postal order which never turns up, have made him famous wherever the Union Jack waves." 

In addition to stories set at Greyfriars School, he featured in many travel series, with trips to China, India, Egypt, Brazil, Hollywood and the South Seas.

Appearance

In his first appearance, Billy Bunter was introduced thus:

Bunter's big round spectacles and rolling gait earned him the nickname the "Owl of the Remove".

In the early stories, both Bunter and classmate Johnny Bull were described as "stout" in appearance; and it was Magnet illustrator C. H. Chapman who first put Bunter into checked-pattern trousers to distinguish the two characters. With the passage of time, the illustrations would show Bunter's circumference becoming ever more pronounced, while Johnny Bull would become indistinguishable from the other schoolboys.

A list of the members of the Remove (Lower Fourth) form was published in Magnet No. 1659 Billy Bunter's Bargain (1939), and provided the boys' ages, heights, and weights. Billy Bunter's age is given as 15 years 1 month; his height as 4 ft 9 ins (145 cm); and his weight as 14 stone 12 lb (94.6 kg).

Character
On many levels, Bunter's character is deeply unattractive. He is the living embodiment of several of the seven deadly sins: pride, envy, avarice, sloth and, most especially, greed and gluttony. Added to these, Bunter is also nosy, deceitful and obtuse. However these traits are softened by Bunter's cheery optimism, his comically transparent untruthfulness and his reliable ineptitude when attempting to conceal his antics from his schoolfellows and schoolmasters.

From the very first Magnet story, Bunter suffers an ongoing shortage of cash and is forever attempting to borrow money from his schoolfellows, explaining that he is expecting a postal order from one of his "titled relations". Over the course of stories spanning several decades, Bunter's celebrated postal order almost never materialises; and the subject becomes a long-running cause of hilarity in the Greyfriars Remove.  Even so, Bunter is a skilful and persistent borrower and succeeds in extracting countless loans from his schoolfellows.  Wealthier schoolboys such as Lord Mauleverer frequently part with a few shillings to be rid of Bunter; but even the notoriously tight-fisted American junior Fisher T Fish was persuaded to loan Bunter cash on at least one occasion.

Bunter's morals are peculiarly his own. He has every intention of repaying the cash he borrows, but allows such debts to linger for months and even years. He is obsessed with food – the sweeter and stickier, the better – and is utterly unscrupulous in helping himself to his schoolfellows' sweets, cakes and hampers, for which he earns countless kickings. But despite his complete lack of morals in such matters, Bunter is otherwise as honest as any other Greyfriars schoolboy.  He would never dream of deliberately stealing money or valuables.

In the early stories, Bunter was associated with his stammering stock phrase: "I'm s-sincerely sorry". As his character developed, the stammering would disappear; and the stock phrase would be replaced by the greeting "I say, you fellows!", the reproachful "Oh really, Wharton!" (or whichever character he is addressing), the anguished exclamation "Yaroooh!" and the distinctive giggle "He, he, he!"

Although Bunter has a keen sense of his own self-importance, this is rarely shared by anyone else at Greyfriars. A notable exception occurs in a 1932 story, when an election for a new Remove Form Captain takes place. The support of the form divides equally between two candidates, leaving Bunter with the casting vote. His support is keenly solicited by supporters of both camps, and Bunter becomes the centre of attention – a position he exploits to the full.  In a conversation with his study mate Peter Todd, Bunter's view of the two candidates offers an insight into his priorities in life:

"I'm thinking it out, Toddy," he answered, without moving.  "Can't say I like either of the beasts much!  Of course, in some ways, Smithy would make a better Form captain than Cherry."
"How do you make that out, fathead—I mean, old fellow!"
"Well, Skinner thinks that if Smithy gets in, a man will be able to dodge games practice without being reported to Wingate."
"Oh crumbs!"
That consideration, evidently, had a strong appeal for Bunter!
"Still, Cherry's not a bad chap in some ways!" said the fat Owl.  "He's a good deal more civil than Smithy, if a fellow drops into his study to tea."
"Oh!" gasped Toddy.
"And—he's not reeking with money like Smithy, but, he's a jolly good deal easier to touch for a small loan when a fellow's been disappointed about a postal order," added Bunter thoughtfully.
Peter Todd gazed at him.  Bunter evidently had his own original ideas about the qualities that were required in a Form captain!

From The Magnet No. 1258 "Bounder and Captain!" (1932)

In the classroom, Bunter's academic abilities are scarce to the point of non-existent. He is the despair of his Form master, Mr Quelch. In this he is not helped by his extreme laziness and unwillingness to indulge in any academic work whatsoever.

Bunter's personal habits are lazy and slovenly. He is always the last to rise from his bed in the morning and always chooses to remain in bed for a few extra minutes in preference to washing himself. His handkerchief is permanently filthy and his waistcoat usually displays prominent clues that reveal the ingredients of his breakfast that day.

A running theme at the beginning of each holiday season is Bunter's persistent attempts to avoid spending vacations with his family and instead to gatecrash the holiday arrangements of one or more of his schoolfellows; and his schoolfellows' (generally unsuccessful) attempts to avoid Bunter's company.

He has two gifts: for cooking, and an uncanny ability to imitate voices (usually inaccurately described as ventriloquism in the stories). This talent was developed in the early Magnet stories, commencing with Magnet No. 32 The Greyfriars Ventriloquist (1908). In a series of stories in which Bunter unsuccessfully attempts, in turn, a physical exercise regime, hypnotism, and mind reading, a visiting ventriloquism show inspires Bunter to believe that he is a born ventriloquist. "More like a born idiot" comments Bob Cherry – but Bunter perseveres and eventually masters the art. It is a talent unappreciated by his schoolfellows, since he generally uses it to make mischief, or, opportunistically, to get himself out of trouble.

Among Bunter's few virtues is an occasional tendency to display courage for the sake of others. To his credit, he is invariably in a state of extreme terror himself on such occasions. This characteristic was first seen in Magnet No. 364 Surprising the School (1915) when he saved his schoolmaster's niece, Cora Quelch, from an angry bull and was afterwards repeated on a number of other occasions. Unfortunately, Bunter's love of the limelight frequently leads him to spoil matters by boasting and exaggerating afterwards. Oddly enough, he also displays generosity, on the rare occasions when he is in possession of food or cash.

Billy Bunter's main redeeming feature is the very genuine love and concern he has for his mother.  This is seen in several stories, usually involving his mother suffering an illness, allowing a better side of Bunter's character to be seen. (Magnets Nos. 1016, 1206 and 1532).

Bunter as a plot driver
For the first fifteen years of the Magnet stories, Bunter was one of the crowd. From the mid-1920s, just as Hamilton increasingly developed Bunter's comic potential, so he began to use Bunter's antics as a means to initiate and drive forward the plots.

Conspiratorial conversations would be overheard by Bunter, whether from the other side of a keyhole or from under the seat in a rail compartment while avoiding the ticket inspector. Bunter would frequently be under a table, or behind an armchair – often hiding from some outraged fellow whose food he had purloined – there to overhear some secret or piece of gossip. Such knowledge would swiftly be shared through Bunter's habit of gossiping. Letters would be purloined by Bunter and not reach the intended recipient. Bunter's ventriloquism skills would be used as a means of creating conflict between other characters. Whilst he was usually not the main protagonist in most of the stories, Bunter's influence as a comical interlude and as a plot driver was felt at every turn.

In The Secret Seven series of 1934, the entire plotline is initiated by Bunter's stupidity, which causes a road accident that results in a number of leading characters being hospitalised.

Bunter as a principal character
During The Magnet era, Billy Bunter is not yet the permanent principal character he would become in the post-war era. The style of the stories is to allow each principal character to take a leading role in turn.  Stronger characters such as Remove Captain Harry Wharton, the hard and rebellious Herbert Vernon-Smith and Fifth form duffer Horace Coker are frequently given leading roles in their own series; and even lesser characters such as American junior Fisher T Fish and aspiring actor William Wibley would occasionally be brought to the fore in their own series.

In this way, Bunter took his turn with the rest, in a number of stories that placed him as the lead protagonist.  Some of the more notable examples include:

 The Bunter Court series from 1925 (Magnet Nos. 910 to 917) – by a combination of trickery and co-incidence, Bunter manages to obtain the tenancy of a stately home, Combermere Lodge, and passes it off as Bunter Court.  Despite the author's comment that this was one of the most contrived plots he had ever been forced to employ, this series is highly regarded by commentators.  It is the more remarkable that the character of Billy Bunter succeeds in being entertaining without the reader ever being invited to display the slightest affection or sympathy for him. After borrowing from his guests to pay the servants wages, and locking the estate agent, the butler and others into the cellar to hide his tracks, Bunter finally flees before receiving his just deserts.    
 The Whiffles Circus series from 1928 (Magnet Nos. 1069 to 1076) – Billy Bunter assumes the identity of Mr Whiffles, the proprietor of a circus, by stealing his clothes, wig and false whiskers, and sustains the impersonation over the course of the storyline when all the circus hands mistake him for the proprietor. 
 The Bunter £100 Boater Hat series from 1933 (Magnet Nos. 1325 to 1326) – tramp Harold Hinks steals a £100 note belonging to Vernon-Smith's father and hides it under the lining of Bunter's straw hat.  Unfortunately, Bunter is wearing a borrowed hat at the time and Mr Hinks' hapless attempts to recover the banknote by snatching a succession of wrong hats from Bunter's head make for entertaining reading. Charles Hamilton once stated his opinion this was one of the funniest stories he ever wrote.
 The Popper Island Rebellion series from 1934 (Magnet Nos. 1374 to 1382) – Billy Bunter is expelled after being wrongfully accused of drenching Fifth Form master Mr Prout in ink. The Remove rise up in his support and build a fortified camp on Popper Island, which they successfully defend against a number of assaults by the prefects and other seniors.

In 1929, the editors of The Magnet persuaded Charles Hamilton to drop the character of Billy Bunter altogether for several editions and attempt a storyline in the style of an action thriller. The result was the Ravenspur Grange series (Magnet Nos. 1122 to 1125) which prompted a strong outcry from the Magnet readership, dismayed at Bunter's disappearance.  Billy Bunter would never be absent from the stories again.

Racism

Charles Hamilton's writings displayed a pronounced prejudice against America and Americans. He repeatedly introduced American characters that were either comical or had unsavoury tendencies, such as racism or usury. A notable example is Billy Bunter's fellow form member Fisher T. Fish, the son of a New York businessman, whose moneylending activities frequently brings him into conflict with the school authorities and who, on occasion, displays racist behaviour.

In comparison with contemporary literature, the Greyfriars stories are unusually firm in rejecting racism. Hamilton uses the technique of giving racist dialogue to antihero characters in a way that demonstrates the offensive nature of racist attitudes, including Bunter himself, who often uses language that modern-day readers would characterise as racist.

In an age when the word "nigger" was not yet regarded in the same pejorative sense that applies today, the Greyfriars stories consistently emphasised the offensive nature of the term from as early as 1922 and the narratives even included unfashionable anti-British sentiments in stories set against the background of imperial India.

Family
Billy Bunter has two siblings: a younger sister, Elizabeth Gertrude (Bessie), who attends the nearby Cliff House School, and a younger brother, Samuel Tuckless (Sammy), who is in the Second Form at Greyfriars School.  Bessie first appears in The Magnet No. 582 The Artful Dodger (1919), before appearing as a regular character in The School Friend later that year. Bessie appears in a total of 116 Magnet stories. Sammy Bunter first appears in The Magnet No. 144 Billy Bunter's Minor (1910) and appears in a further 291  Magnet stories.

There is little love lost between the three, as is shown in this passage from one of the earlier stories:

Their father is Mr William Samuel Bunter, a portly, largely unsuccessful, stockbroker with a severe manner; although it is noted that "like many middle-aged gentlemen, Mr. Bunter was better tempered after breakfast." He is perpetually complaining about income tax and school fees and is brusque in his relations with his children. Written correspondence between Billy and his father consists of continual requests from Billy to supplement his pocket money, and continual refusals from his father to accede.  By contrast, Billy Bunter is particularly close to his mother, Mrs Amelia Bunter, a kindly lady who appears only briefly in seven stories.

Billy's cousin Walter Gilbert (Wally) Bunter was introduced in Magnet No. 333 The Dark Horse (1914) and appears in a further 32 Magnet stories. He is Billy's exact double, excepting only for his spectacles, but is his opposite in every other respect.

Other members of the Bunter family to appear briefly over the years include Billy Bunter's uncles James, George and Claude, his aunts Prudence and Claribel, his great-aunt Eliza Judith and (in a one-off story) Sir Foulkes Bunter and his son.

Bunter boasts of living at Bunter Court, a stately home with liveried servants and a fleet of chauffeured Rolls-Royce cars. On closer inspection, however, this turns out to be the modest Bunter Villa in Surrey, with a maid, a cook and a single Ford car.

Reprints
Many stories which had originally seen publication in The Magnet were reprinted in the Schoolboys Own Library before World War II and some by Armada and Paul Hamlyn in the 1970s.  Most of the 1,683 issues of The Magnet were reprinted in hardback facsimile form by publisher W. Howard Baker, under his Howard Baker and Greyfriars Book Club imprints, between 1969 and 1990.

Post-war stories

Hardback stories 
Following the closure of The Magnet in 1940, Hamilton had little work; but he became known as the author of the Greyfriars stories following a newspaper interview he gave to the London Evening Standard.

Although he had written many thousands of stories published between 1900 and 1940 by the Amalgamated Press, he had written them under dozens of pen names: so he himself was quite unknown prior to the appearance of the newspaper article. Nor was it even widely known, until then, that the stories written under those pen names were, in the main, the work of one man.

Hamilton was not able to continue the Greyfriars saga immediately, as the Amalgamated Press claimed ownership to all the characters except  Billy Bunter who actually appeared in a Sparshott story in 1946. However, by 1947 they had relented, and Hamilton was then able to obtain a contract from publishers Charles Skilton for a series of stories to be issued in hardback form. The first of these, Billy Bunter of Greyfriars School, was published in September 1947. It began a series that continued for the rest of Hamilton's life. In the 1950s the initial novels were reprinted by Cassells, who took over publication of the series.

Radio 
Billy Bunter has been adapted for radio as an audio play several times, the last occasion being a 90-minute adaptation of the novel Billy Bunter's Christmas Party broadcast on BBC Radio 4, as part of the series Saturday Night Theatre, in December 1986.

In the 1990s, a series of short stories adapted from the novels of Charles Hamilton were performed by The Goodies (Graeme Garden, Bill Oddie, Tim Brooke-Taylor) for BBC radio, as six 15 minute dramas

A radio documentary about the character aired on the 40th anniversary of the closure of The Magnet.

Television 

Billy Bunter was played by Gerald Campion in the BBC television series Billy Bunter of Greyfriars School.  The series also featured Anthony Valentine as Harry Wharton, Michael Crawford as Frank Nugent, Jeremy Bulloch as Bob Cherry, Melvyn Hayes as Harold Skinner, John Woodnutt, Raf De La Torre, Kynaston Reeves and Jack Melford as Mr Quelch, Roger Delgado as Monsieur Charpentier and Kenneth Cope as school bully Gerald Loder.

A total of 52 half-hour episodes was broadcast over seven series, between 1952 and 1961, including three television specials. The television show was totally centred on Bunter, with the other characters playing only a peripheral role.

All the television scripts were written by Charles Hamilton. The programme's memorable theme music was the "Portsmouth" section of Ralph Vaughan Williams's Sea Songs. The episodes were transmitted "live" in black and white format, and a dozen still exist in the BBC's archive as telerecordings (see also Wiping). The survivors are the complete third series (six episodes), one of the "specials", one episode from the fifth series, and four episodes from the sixth series.

Stage 
Billy Bunter appeared in several Christmas stage shows with different casts:
 1958. Billy Bunter's Mystery Christmas (Palace Theatre, London)
 1959. Billy Bunter Flies East (Victoria Palace Theatre)
 1960. Billy Bunter's Swiss Roll (Victoria Palace Theatre)
 1961. Billy Bunter Shipwrecked (Victoria Palace Theatre)
 1962. Billy Bunter's Christmas Circus (Queen's Theatre)
 1963. Billy Bunter meets Magic (Shaftesbury Theatre)

Comics 
After The Magnet closed in 1940, Bunter appeared in children's comics, as a strip cartoon character: initially, from 15 June 1940, he appeared in Knockout (which, like The Magnet, was published by The Amalgamated Press). Although Knockout had begun only in 1939, it already had a circulation several times that of The Magnet. C H Chapman, the last illustrator for The Magnet, drew the first nine Knockout strips in 1939, after which several artists were tried, before Frank Minnitt established himself with a beaming and bouncy Bunter, which at first followed Chapman's style, then later branched into a style of his own, concentrating on slapstick humour. Soon the Famous Five vanished from the strip, replaced by Jones minor, who had all the good qualities Bunter lacked, but who was prone to being led astray by Bunter. The form-master, Mr Quelch, stayed (at least in name), but he lost his dignity and aloofness.
Minnitt continued producing the strip until his death in 1958. Reg Parlett then took over until Knockout ceased publication in 1961, when the strip transferred to Valiant comic, and then to TV Comic, where it ran until 1984. Bunter also appeared in many Knockout annuals, even on some covers.

C. H. Chapman drew a strip for The Comet comic in 1956, which featured the classical old Bunter of The Magnet and the Famous Five, consisting of twelve weeks of 2-page strips (24 pages in all). Altogether, Bunter's appearances in Comet lasted from March 1950 until June 1958, with picture stories from February 1952.

From 1955, Billy Bunter comic strips were published in the Netherlands, in the Dutch-language comic Sjors, with the character renamed "Billie Turf". Bunter thus became one of the house characters of that comic and its successors, and so continued appearing in anthology-style collections in Dutch until the end of the 20th century. "Billie Turf" comic strip albums were published from 1963 onwards, and have continued into the 21st century. Three Billie Turf movies were made by Henk van der Linden between 1978 and 1983, mostly spelling the name of the main character as "Billy Turf": Billy Turf het dikste studentje ter wereld (1978), Billy Turf Haantje de voorste (1981) and Billy Turf contra Kwel (1982).

Appearances in other fiction 
 Billy Bunter appears in Alan Moore and Kevin O'Neill's graphic novel The League of Extraordinary Gentlemen: Black Dossier, and still resides at the now closed Greyfriars in 1958 as an old man. He sells information about the former students of the school, which is supposed to have been a recruiting ground for spies and agents for the crown since the 16th century. To avoid copyright issues, as the character is still under copyright, the graphic novel only refers to the character by his first name.
 Bunter appears in the Viz cartoon strip "Baxter Basics" (the title spoofing a slogan of the Conservative Party, "Back to Basics") as Sir William Bunter, Conservative MP for Greyfriars Central. The character was immediately killed off by Baxter, so that he could take over that Parliamentary seat.
 In Bunter Sahib by Daniel Green, Bunter's identical ancestor is placed in 19th-century India.
 David Hughes in But for Bunter creates the idea that the Greyfriars stories were based on real people, and set out to find them and hear their stories. This echoed the theme of a contemporary BBC radio documentary, Whatever Happened to... Henry Samuel Quelch.
 Cyril, a thinly veiled version of Billy Bunter, appears in the Doctor Who story "The Celestial Toymaker". As the character was still under copyright, a BBC continuity announcer was obliged to deny any deliberate similarity between the characters after the episodes aired.

References

Bibliography 
 .
 .
 .
 .
 .
 .
 .
 .
 .
 .
 .
 .

External links 
 Friardale Collection of Charles Hamilton material: Novels, story papers, etc.
 The Magnet 1908–1940 Original Greyfriars stories: facsimile editions of The Magnet
 Collecting Books and Magazines Detailed article
 Greyfriars, The Magnet & Billy Bunter Facts and Figures
 Greyfriars Index Detailed listing of Hamilton's work
 The Friars Club Enthusiasts' Club
 The Magnet Detailed site about The Magnet
 Bunterzone Enthusiasts' site
 Index of Boys Weeklies

British boys' story papers
Literary characters introduced in 1908
Series of books
Child characters in literature
British comic strips
1939 comics debuts
Comics characters introduced in 1939
1984 comics debuts
British comics characters
Male characters in literature
Child characters in comics
Male characters in comics
Comedy literature characters
British humour comics
Gag-a-day comics
School-themed comics
Novels set in the United Kingdom
Comics set in the United Kingdom
Novels adapted into comics
British novels adapted into plays
British novels adapted into films
Novels adapted into radio programs
British novels adapted into television shows
Boarding school fiction